Joshua Ray Burkman (born April 10, 1980) is a retired American professional mixed martial artist formerly competing in the Welterweight division. He formerly competed in the Ultimate Fighting Championship, the World Series of Fighting, the XFC, and was a contestant on The Ultimate Fighter 2.

Background
Burkman was born in Salt Lake City, Utah, he attended Cottonwood High School. He was a three-sport star athlete for the Colts. He was a Class 5A All-State third baseman on the baseball team, and was captain of the football team, where he rushed for over 1,000 yards as a senior. As a member of the wrestling team, he finished second place in the state championships in the 171-pound division.

Burkman played two seasons of college football before he began his career in mixed martial arts. He spent his freshman season at Snow College in Ephraim, Utah, but he missed half the season with an injury. Then he transferred to Dixie State College in St. George, Utah. His sophomore season (2001) was spectacular: he rushed for 1,439 yards and 13 touchdowns for the Rebels, earning JUCO All-American honors. His team won the Dixie Rotary Bowl; for his performance, Burkman earned a scholarship offer from the University of Utah. Ultimately, he decided to drop football and pursue mixed martial arts.

Mixed martial arts career

Ultimate Fighting Championship
Burkman was originally chosen to be on the inaugural season of The Ultimate Fighter, but he failed pre-show drug test failure and admitted to taking Winstrol. He was later a contestant on The Ultimate Fighter 2 as part of Team Hughes.

Burkman was signed by the UFC and had his debut fight at The Ultimate Fighter 2 Finale; he defeated Sammy Morgan by knockout in 21 seconds of the first round.

During his time with the UFC, Burkman earned wins over Drew Fickett, Josh Neer, and Forrest Petz, but was largely unsuccessful against the bigger names in the division. After three back-to-back losses in 2008, Burkman was cut from the UFC with a record of 5 wins and 5 losses.

Showdown Fights
On November 20, 2009, Burkman faced Ultimate Fighter alumni Brandon Melendez defeating him by KO in round one at Throwdown Showdown 5.

On April 9, 2010, Burkman took on Jake Paul at Showdown Fights – Burkman vs. Paul winning via unanimous decision.

On September 24, 2010, Burkman faced undefeated Jordan Smith at Showdown Fights – Respect. Burkman won the fight via split decision.

On April 2, 2011, Burkman faced Canadian prospect Jordan Mein at MMA: The Reckoning in Orillia, Ontario, Canada, Burkman lost via unanimous decision.

On February 24, 2012, Burkman faced Koffi Adzitso at Showdown Fights – Breakout, Burkman won via unanimous decision.

On August 25, 2012, Burkman faced Ultimate Fighter alumni Jamie Yager at Showdown Fights - Burkman vs. Yager. Burkman won via guillotine choke submission.

World Series of Fighting
On September 6, 2012, it was announced that Burkman was one of many fighters to sign on with new MMA Promotion the World Series of Fighting.  He faced Gerald Harris on November 3, 2012, at  WSOF 1 and won via unanimous decision.

Burkman faced Aaron Simpson at World Series of Fighting 2 on March 23, 2013. He won the fight via KO due to a knee strike and punches in the first round.

Burkman faced Jon Fitch on June 14, 2013, at World Series of Fighting 3 in a rematch of their first fight in which Burkman lost to Fitch due to a rear naked choke. Burkman avenged his loss, dropping Fitch with a series of punches before applying a guillotine choke submission and getting the win in just 41 seconds of round number one.

Burkman faced Steve Carl on October 26, 2013, at WSOF 6 in the main event for the WSOF Welterweight Championship. He lost the fight via triangle choke in the fourth round. It was noted that Josh did tap out from the choke but the ref ignored the tap, allowing Steve Carl to choke Burkman until he lost consciousness.

Burkman faced Tyler Stinson at WSOF 9 on March 29, 2014. He won the fight via knockout in the first round.

Return to the Ultimate Fighting Championship

Burkman signed a contract to return to the UFC for the first time since 2008 on October 3, 2014.  Burkman faced Héctor Lombard on January 3, 2015, at UFC 182. He lost the fight by unanimous decision.  Subsequently, it was revealed that Lombard failed his post-fight drug test. On March 23, 2015, it was announced by the NSAC that the result of the fight had been overturned to a no contest.

Burkman faced Dong Hyun Kim on May 23, 2015, at UFC 187.  Burkman lost the fight via submission in the third round.

Burkman faced Patrick Côté on August 23, 2015, at UFC Fight Night 74. He lost the back and forth fight via TKO in the third round and both participants were awarded Fight of the Night honors.

For his next fight, Burkman dropped down to the lightweight division as he faced K. J. Noons on February 6, 2016, at UFC Fight Night 82. He won the fight by unanimous decision.

Burkman next faced Paul Felder on May 29, 2016, at UFC Fight Night 88. He lost the fight via unanimous decision.

Burkman was expected to face Bobby Green on October 1, 2016, at UFC Fight Night 96. However, Green pulled out of the fight citing an undisclosed injury. He was replaced by promotional newcomer Zak Ottow. As a result of the late notice opponent change, the bout was contested at welterweight. He lost the fight via split decision.

Burkman faced Michel Prazeres on March 11, 2017, at UFC Fight Night 106. He lost the fight via submission in the first round.

Burkman faced Drew Dober on July 29, 2017, at UFC 214. He lost the fight by knockout in the first round.

Burkman faced Alex Morono on February 18, 2018, at UFC Fight Night 126 at the welterweight division. He lost the fight via a guillotine choke submission in the first round.

Post-UFC career
After being released from the UFC for the second time, Burkman faced William Macário at LFA 66 on May 10, 2019. He lost the fight via split decision and announced his retirement from MMA.

Championships & accomplishments
Ultimate Fighting Championship
Fight of the Night (One time)
MMAJunkie.com
2015 August Fight of the Month vs. Patrick Côté
Sherdog
2013 Submission of the Year  vs. Jon Fitch

Personal life
Burkman dated current UFC ring girl, Arianny Celeste.

Burkman married Brandy Lyn Winfield, 2010 International Yoga Champion, on December 1, 2011. Together they have a son, Legend Burkman, who was born in 2012 and had a second son Atlas born January 13, 2015.

His older brother Jered was a star baseball player alongside Chris Shelton at both Cottonwood High School and Salt Lake Community College.

Mixed martial arts record

|-
|Loss
|align=center|28–18 (1)
|William Macário
|Decision (split)
|LFA 66
|
|align=center|3
|align=center|5:00
|West Valley City, Utah, United States
|
|-
|Loss
|align=center|28–17 (1)
|Alex Morono
|Submission (guillotine choke)
|UFC Fight Night: Cowboy vs. Medeiros 
|
|align=center|1
|align=center|2:12
|Austin, Texas, United States
|
|-
|Loss
|align=center|28–16 (1)
|Drew Dober
|KO (punch)
|UFC 214
|
|align=center|1
|align=center|3:04
|Anaheim, California, United States
|
|-
|Loss
|align=center|28–15 (1)
|Michel Prazeres
|Submission (north-south choke)
|UFC Fight Night: Belfort vs. Gastelum
|
|align=center|1
|align=center|1:42
|Fortaleza, Brazil
|
|-
|Loss
|align=center|28–14 (1) 
|Zak Ottow
|Decision (split)
|UFC Fight Night: Lineker vs. Dodson
|
|align=center|3
|align=center|5:00
|Portland, Oregon, United States
|
|-
|Loss
|align=center|28–13 (1)
|Paul Felder
|Decision (unanimous)
|UFC Fight Night: Almeida vs. Garbrandt
|
|align=center|3
|align=center|5:00
|Las Vegas, Nevada, United States
| 
|-
|Win
|align=center|28–12 (1)
|K. J. Noons
|Decision (unanimous)
|UFC Fight Night: Hendricks vs. Thompson
|
|align=center|3
|align=center|5:00
|Las Vegas, Nevada, United States
|
|-
|Loss
|align=center|27–12 (1)
|Patrick Côté
|TKO (punches)
|UFC Fight Night: Holloway vs. Oliveira
|
|align=center|3
|align=center|1:26
|Saskatoon, Saskatchewan, Canada
|
|-
|Loss
|align=center|27–11 (1)
|Dong Hyun Kim
|Submission (arm-triangle choke)
|UFC 187
|
|align=center|3
|align=center|2:13
|Las Vegas, Nevada, United States
|
|-
| NC
| align=center| 27–10 (1)
| Héctor Lombard
| NC (overturned) 
| UFC 182
| 
| align=center| 3
| align=center| 5:00
| Las Vegas, Nevada, United States
|
|-
| Win
| align=center| 27–10
| Tyler Stinson
| KO (punch)
| WSOF 9
| 
| align=center| 1
| align=center| 2:15
| Las Vegas, Nevada, United States
| 
|-
| Loss
| align=center| 26–10
| Steve Carl
| Technical Submission (triangle choke)
| WSOF 6
| 
| align=center| 4
| align=center| 1:02
| Coral Gables, Florida, United States
| 
|-
| Win
| align=center| 26–9
| Jon Fitch
| Technical Submission (guillotine choke)
| WSOF 3
| 
| align=center| 1
| align=center| 0:41
| Las Vegas, Nevada, United States
| 
|-
| Win
| align=center| 25–9
| Aaron Simpson 
| KO (knee and punches)
| WSOF 2
| 
| align=center| 1
| align=center| 3:04
| Atlantic City, New Jersey, United States
| 
|-
| Win
| align=center| 24–9
| Gerald Harris 
| Decision (unanimous)
| WSOF 1
| 
| align=center| 3
| align=center| 5:00
| Las Vegas, Nevada, United States
| 
|-
| Win
| align=center| 23–9
| Jamie Yager
| Submission (guillotine choke)
| Showdown Fights 8 – Burkman vs. Yager
| 
| align=center| 2
| align=center| 3:25
| Orem, Utah, United States
| 
|-
| Win
| align=center| 22–9
| Koffi Adzitso
| Decision (unanimous)
| Showdown Fights 6 – Breakout
| 
| align=center| 3
| align=center| 5:00
| Orem, Utah, United States
| 
|-
| Loss
| align=center| 21–9
| Jordan Mein
| Decision (unanimous)
| MMA 1: The Reckoning
| 
| align=center| 3
| align=center| 5:00
| Rama, Ontario, Canada
| 
|-
| Win
| align=center| 21–8
| Jordan Smith
| Decision (split)
| Showdown Fights 2: Respect
| 
| align=center| 3
| align=center| 5:00
| Orem, Utah, United States
| 
|-
| Win
| align=center| 20–8
| Jake Paul
| Decision (unanimous)
| Showdown Fights 1: Burkman vs. Paul
| 
| align=center| 3
| align=center| 5:00
| Orem, Utah, United States
| 
|-
| Win
| align=center| 19–8
| Brandon Melendez
| KO (punch)
| Throwdown Showdown 5
| 
| align=center| 1
| align=center| 4:14
| Orem, Utah, United States
| 
|-
| Loss
| align=center| 18–8
| Pete Sell
| Decision (unanimous)
| UFC 90
| 
| align=center| 3
| align=center| 5:00
| Rosemont, Illinois, United States
| 
|-
| Loss
| align=center| 18–7
| Dustin Hazelett
| Submission (armbar)
| The Ultimate Fighter: Team Rampage vs Team Forrest Finale
| 
| align=center| 2
| align=center| 4:46
| Las Vegas, Nevada, United States
| 
|-
| Loss
| align=center| 18–6
| Mike Swick
| Decision (majority)
| UFC Fight Night: Swick vs. Burkman
| 
| align=center| 3
| align=center| 5:00
| Las Vegas, Nevada, United States
| 
|-
| Win
| align=center| 18–5
| Forrest Petz
| Decision (split)
| UFC 77
| 
| align=center| 3
| align=center| 5:00
| Cincinnati, Ohio, United States
| 
|-
| Loss
| align=center| 17–5
| Karo Parisyan
| Decision (unanimous)
| UFC 71
| 
| align=center| 3
| align=center| 5:00
| Las Vegas, Nevada, United States
| 
|-
| Win
| align=center| 17–4
| Chad Reiner
| Decision (unanimous)
| UFC Fight Night: Evans vs. Salmon
| 
| align=center| 3
| align=center| 5:00
| Hollywood, Florida, United States
| 
|-
| Win
| align=center| 16–4
| Josh Neer
| Decision (unanimous)
| UFC 61
| 
| align=center| 3
| align=center| 5:00
| Las Vegas, Nevada, United States
| 
|-
| Loss
| align=center| 15–4
| Jon Fitch
| Submission (rear-naked choke)
| UFC Fight Night 4
| 
| align=center| 2
| align=center| 4:57
| Las Vegas, Nevada, United States
| 
|-
| Win
| align=center| 15–3
| Drew Fickett
| Submission (guillotine choke)
| UFC Fight Night 3
| 
| align=center| 1
| align=center| 1:07
| Las Vegas, Nevada, United States
| 
|-
| Win
| align=center| 14–3
| Sammy Morgan
| KO (slam and elbows)
| The Ultimate Fighter 2 Finale
| 
| align=center| 1
| align=center| 0:21
| Las Vegas, Nevada, United States
| 
|-
| Loss
| align=center| 13–3
| Jeremy Horn
| Technical Submission (choke)
| XFC – Dome Of Destruction 1
| 
| align=center| 1
| align=center| 1:14
| Tacoma, Washington, United States
|Middleweight bout.
|-
| Win
| align=center| 13–2
| Brian Wieber
| TKO (punches) 
| IFC: Eve Of Destruction
| 
| align=center| 1
| align=center| 2:36
| Salt Lake City, Utah, United States
|Welterweight debut.
|-
| Win
| align=center| 12–2
| Kyacey Uscola
| Submission (rear-naked choke)
| SF 4: Fight For Freedom
| 
| align=center| 1
| align=center| N/A
| Salt Lake City, Utah, United States
| 
|-
| Win
| align=center| 11–2
| Drew Ellisor
| Decision (unanimous)
| Cage Fighting Championship 1
| 
| align=center| 3
| align=center| 5:00
| Salt Lake City, Utah, United States
| 
|-
| Win
| align=center| 10–2
| Isidro Gonzalez
| Submission (guillotine choke)
| SF 2: On the Move
| 
| align=center| 1
| align=center| 1:58
| Portland, Oregon, United States
| 
|-
| Loss
| align=center| 9–2
| Matt Horwich
| Submission (triangle choke)
| SF 1: Revolution
| 
| align=center| 2
| align=center| 2:11
| Portland, Oregon, United States
| 
|-
| Win
| align=center| 9–1
| Jeremy Brown
| Decision
| UCE Winter Warrior Land: Episode 1
| 
| align=center| N/A
| align=center| N/A
| Salt Lake City, Utah, United States
| 
|-
| Win
| align=center| 8–1
| Derek Downey
| Decision (unanimous)
| UCE Summer Series: Episode 4
| 
| align=center| 3
| align=center| 3:00
| Salt Lake City, Utah, United States
| 
|-
| Win
| align=center| 7–1
| Brian Garlick
| Submission (choke) 
| UCE Round 4: Finals
| 
| align=center| 2
| align=center| N/A
| Salt Lake City, Utah, United States
| 
|-
| Win
| align=center| 6–1
| Jeremy Brown
| Submission (choke) 
| UCE Round 4: Semi-Finals
| 
| align=center| 1
| align=center| N/A
| Salt Lake City, Utah, United States
| 
|-
| Win
| align=center| 5–1
| Matthew Bell
| KO (punch) 
| UCE Round 4: Episode 4
| 
| align=center| 1
| align=center| N/A
| Salt Lake City, Utah, United States
| 
|-
| Win
| align=center| 4–1
| Gedeon Jarvis
| Submission (choke) 
| UCE Round 3: Finals
| 
| align=center| 1
| align=center| N/A
| Salt Lake City, Utah, United States
| 
|-
| Win
| align=center| 3–1
| Hank Weiss
| KO (punch) 
| UCE Round 3: Semi-Finals
| 
| align=center| 1
| align=center| N/A
| Salt Lake City, Utah, United States
| 
|-
| Win
| align=center| 2–1
| Matt King
| Submission (choke) 
| UCE Round 3: Episode 2
| 
| align=center| 1
| align=center| N/A
| Salt Lake City, Utah, United States
| 
|-
| Win
| align=center| 1–1
| Cedric Nicholsen
| Submission (choke) 
| UCE Round 3: Episode 1
| 
| align=center| 1
| align=center| N/A
| Salt Lake City, Utah, United States
| 
|-
| Loss
| align=center| 0–1
| Hank Weiss
| Submission (choke) 
| UCE Round 2: Episode 1
| 
| align=center| N/A
| align=center| N/A
| Salt Lake City, Utah, United States
|

See also
 List of current UFC fighters
 List of male mixed martial artists

References

External links 
 
 
 Josh Burkman at WSOF.com (archived)
 Josh Burkman at ShowdownFights.com (archived)

1980 births
American male mixed martial artists
Utah Tech University alumni
Living people
Mixed martial artists from Utah
Sportspeople from Salt Lake City
Snow College alumni
University of Utah alumni
Welterweight mixed martial artists
Middleweight mixed martial artists
Lightweight mixed martial artists
Mixed martial artists utilizing wrestling
Ultimate Fighting Championship male fighters
Cottonwood High School (Murray, Utah) alumni
Snow Badgers football players